Train to Tombstone is a 1950 American Western film directed by William Berke and starring Don "Red" Barry, Robert Lowery, Wally Vernon, Tom Neal and Judith Allen.

Plot
Indians attack a train with an Army agent (Don Barry) and gold on board.

Cast
 Don "Red" Barry as Len Howard (as Don Barry)
 Robert Lowery as Marshal Staley 
 Wally Vernon as Clifton Gulliver 
 Tom Neal as Dr. Willoughty
 Judith Allen as Belle Faith 
 Barbara Staley as Doris Clayton
 Minna Phillips as Aunt Abbie
 Nan Leslie as Marie Bell
 Claude Stroud as Deputy Marshall 
 Ed Cassidy as George - Conductor

See also
 List of American films of 1950

References

External links

Train to Tombstone at TCMDB

1950 films
1950 Western (genre) films
American black-and-white films
American heist films
American Western (genre) films
1950s English-language films
Films directed by William A. Berke
Rail transport films
Lippert Pictures films
1950s American films